The arrondissement of Épinal is an arrondissement of France in the Vosges department in the Grand Est region. It has 236 communes.

Composition

The communes of the arrondissement of Épinal, and their INSEE codes are:

Les Ableuvenettes (88001) 
Ahéville (88002) 
Ambacourt (88006) 
Anglemont (88008) 
Arches (88011) 
Archettes (88012) 
Autrey (88021) 
Avillers (88023) 
Avrainville (88024) 
Aydoilles (88026) 
Badménil-aux-Bois (88027) 
La Baffe (88028) 
Bainville-aux-Saules (88030) 
Battexey (88038) 
Baudricourt (88039) 
Bayecourt (88040) 
Bazegney (88041) 
Bazien (88042) 
Beauménil (88046) 
Begnécourt (88047) 
Bellefontaine (88048) 
Belmont-sur-Buttant (88050) 
Bettegney-Saint-Brice (88055) 
Bettoncourt (88056) 
Biécourt (88058) 
Blémerey (88060) 
Bocquegney (88063) 
Boulaincourt (88066) 
Bouxières-aux-Bois (88069) 
Bouxurulles (88070) 
Bouzemont (88071) 
Brantigny (88073) 
Brouvelieures (88076) 
Brû (88077) 
Bruyères (88078) 
Bult (88080) 
Bussang (88081) 
Chamagne (88084) 
Champ-le-Duc (88086) 
Chantraine (88087) 
La Chapelle-aux-Bois (88088) 
Charmes (88090) 
Charmois-devant-Bruyères (88091) 
Charmois-l'Orgueilleux (88092) 
Châtel-sur-Moselle (88094) 
Chauffecourt (88097) 
Chaumousey (88098) 
Chavelot (88099) 
Chef-Haut (88100) 
Cheniménil (88101) 
Circourt (88103) 
Le Clerjus (88108) 
Clézentaine (88110) 
Damas-aux-Bois (88121) 
Damas-et-Bettegney (88122) 
Darnieulles (88126) 
Deinvillers (88127) 
Derbamont (88129) 
Destord (88130) 
Deycimont (88131) 
Deyvillers (88132) 
Dignonville (88133) 
Dinozé (88134) 
Docelles (88135) 
Dogneville (88136) 
Dombasle-en-Xaintois (88139) 
Domèvre-sur-Avière (88142) 
Domèvre-sur-Durbion (88143) 
Domfaing (88145) 
Dommartin-aux-Bois (88147) 
Dommartin-lès-Remiremont (88148) 
Dompaire (88151) 
Dompierre (88152) 
Domptail (88153) 
Domvallier (88155) 
Doncières (88156) 
Dounoux (88157) 
Éloyes (88158) 
Épinal (88160) 
Essegney (88163) 
Évaux-et-Ménil (88166) 
Faucompierre (88167) 
Fauconcourt (88168) 
Fays (88169) 
Ferdrupt (88170) 
Fiménil (88172) 
Florémont (88173) 
Fomerey (88174) 
Fontenay (88175) 
Fontenoy-le-Château (88176) 
Les Forges (88178) 
Fremifontaine (88184) 
Frenelle-la-Grande (88185) 
Frenelle-la-Petite (88186) 
Fresse-sur-Moselle (88188) 
Frizon (88190) 
Gelvécourt-et-Adompt (88192) 
Gigney (88200) 
Girancourt (88201) 
Gircourt-lès-Viéville (88202) 
Girecourt-sur-Durbion (88203) 
Girmont-Val-d'Ajol (88205) 
Golbey (88209) 
Gorhey (88210) 
Grandvillers (88216) 
Gruey-lès-Surance (88221) 
Gugnécourt (88222) 
Gugney-aux-Aulx (88223) 
Hadigny-les-Verrières (88224) 
Hadol (88225) 
Hagécourt (88226) 
Haillainville (88228) 
Hardancourt (88230) 
Harol (88233) 
La Haye (88236) 
Hennecourt (88237) 
Hergugney (88239) 
Herpelmont (88240) 
Housseras (88243) 
Hymont (88246) 
Igney (88247) 
Jarménil (88250) 
Jeanménil (88251) 
Jeuxey (88253) 
Jorxey (88254) 
Jussarupt (88256) 
Juvaincourt (88257) 
Langley (88260) 
Laval-sur-Vologne (88261) 
Laveline-devant-Bruyères (88262) 
Laveline-du-Houx (88263) 
Légéville-et-Bonfays (88264) 
Lépanges-sur-Vologne (88266) 
Longchamp (88273) 
Madecourt (88279) 
Madegney (88280) 
Madonne-et-Lamerey (88281) 
Marainville-sur-Madon (88286) 
Maroncourt (88288) 
Mattaincourt (88292) 
Mazeley (88294) 
Mazirot (88295) 
Méménil (88297) 
Ménarmont (88298) 
Le Ménil (88302) 
Ménil-sur-Belvitte (88301) 
Mirecourt (88304) 
Montmotier (88311) 
Moriville (88313) 
Moyemont (88318) 
La Neuveville-devant-Lépanges (88322) 
Nomexy (88327) 
Nonzeville (88331) 
Nossoncourt (88333) 
Oëlleville (88334) 
Ortoncourt (88338) 
Padoux (88340) 
Pallegney (88342) 
Pierrefitte (88347) 
Pierrepont-sur-l'Arentèle (88348) 
Plombières-les-Bains (88351) 
Pont-sur-Madon (88354) 
Portieux (88355) 
Poussay (88357) 
Pouxeux (88358) 
Prey (88359) 
Puzieux (88364) 
Racécourt (88365) 
Rambervillers (88367) 
Ramecourt (88368) 
Ramonchamp (88369) 
Rancourt (88370) 
Raon-aux-Bois (88371) 
Rapey (88374) 
Regney (88378) 
Rehaincourt (88379) 
Remicourt (88382) 
Remiremont (88383) 
Renauvoid (88388) 
Repel (88389) 
Romont (88395) 
Le Roulier (88399) 
Rouvres-en-Xaintois (88400) 
Roville-aux-Chênes (88402) 
Rugney (88406) 
Rupt-sur-Moselle (88408) 
Saint-Amé (88409) 
Saint-Benoît-la-Chipotte (88412) 
Sainte-Barbe (88410) 
Sainte-Hélène (88418) 
Saint-Étienne-lès-Remiremont (88415) 
Saint-Genest (88416) 
Saint-Gorgon (88417) 
Saint-Maurice-sur-Mortagne (88425) 
Saint-Maurice-sur-Moselle (88426) 
Saint-Nabord (88429) 
Saint-Pierremont (88432) 
Saint-Prancher (88433) 
Saint-Vallier (88437) 
Sanchey (88439) 
Savigny (88449) 
Sercœur (88454) 
Socourt (88458) 
Thaon-les-Vosges (88465) 
Le Thillot (88468) 
Thiraucourt (88469) 
Totainville (88476) 
Trémonzey (88479) 
Ubexy (88480) 
Uriménil (88481) 
Uxegney (88483) 
Uzemain (88484) 
Le Val-d'Ajol (88487) 
Valleroy-aux-Saules (88489) 
Varmonzey (88493) 
Vaubexy (88494) 
Vaudéville (88495) 
Vaxoncourt (88497) 
Vecoux (88498) 
Velotte-et-Tatignécourt (88499) 
Vervezelle (88502) 
Villers (88507) 
Ville-sur-Illon (88508) 
Villoncourt (88509) 
Viménil (88512) 
Vincey (88513) 
La Vôge-les-Bains (88029) 
Les Voivres (88520) 
Vomécourt (88521) 
Vomécourt-sur-Madon (88522) 
Vroville (88525) 
Xaffévillers (88527) 
Xamontarupt (88528) 
Xaronval (88529) 
Xertigny (88530) 
Zincourt (88532)

History

The arrondissement of Épinal was created in 1800. In January 2013 the two cantons of Darney and Monthureux-sur-Saône passed from the arrondissement of Épinal to the arrondissement of Neufchâteau. At the January 2019 reorganisation of the arrondissements of Vosges, it lost 2 communes to and gained 32 communes from the arrondissement of Neufchâteau, and it lost 15 communes to and gained 7 communes from the arrondissement of Saint-Dié-des-Vosges.

As a result of the reorganisation of the cantons of France which came into effect in 2015, the borders of the cantons are no longer related to the borders of the arrondissements. The cantons of the arrondissement of Épinal were, as of January 2015:

 Bains-les-Bains
 Bruyères
 Charmes
 Châtel-sur-Moselle
 Dompaire
 Épinal-Est
 Épinal-Ouest
 Plombières-les-Bains
 Rambervillers
 Remiremont
 Saulxures-sur-Moselotte
 Le Thillot
 Xertigny

References

Epinal